is a Japanese musician, singer, songwriter, lyricist, composer and actor. He is the vocalist of the flumpool and The Turtles Japan.

Overview
Yamamura wrote most of flumpool's songs.
The equipment he used is a Gibson Les Paul Special.

Biography
During his college years Yamamura performed in the streets along with two members which included flumpool member Genki Amakawa.
He underwent throat polyp surgery in June 2010.
Although the polyps were discovered when the band made their debut, Yamamura continued music activities after resting. However he checked that his throat was in an uncomfortable sensation during a live rehearsal in February 2010, it was confirmed that the polyp was enlarged, and due to this he decided to take the remedy for a month after the tour with his intention. His postoperative live concert was the Setstock '10.
Yamamura appeared just by himself in Mobage's new television advertisement called Donna Mirai ni mo Ai wa aru in June 2011. This was his first solo activity.
In November 2014, Yamamura, along with Seiji Kameda and Kazuki Sakai, formed the band The Turtles Japan and started with the single "It's Alright!" The song became the theme song became the theme song of Tokyo Broadcasting Systems's Count Down TV for October and November.
In 26 June 2016, Yamamura announced that he married a non-celebrity woman.
He made his acting debut as the lead role co-starring with Mariya Nishiuchi in Fuji Television's Getsuku drama Totsuzen desuga, Ashita Kekkon shimasu in January 2017.

Music instruments he used
Fender Classic Series '60s Telecaster (used until around 2010)
Fender Custom Shop 1959 Telecaster (Currently used in the music video of "Touch")
Gibson Les Paul Custom
Rickenbacker Les Paul (red)
K. Yairi Akogi

Filmography

TV dramas

Advertisements

See also
flumpool

References

External links
 

1985 births
Living people
Musicians from Osaka Prefecture
Japanese male rock singers
Japanese male pop singers
Japanese male singer-songwriters
Japanese singer-songwriters
A-Sketch artists
People from Matsubara, Osaka
21st-century Japanese singers
21st-century Japanese male singers